WQZK-FM is a Contemporary Hit Radio formatted broadcast radio station licensed to Keyser, West Virginia, serving the Keyser/Cumberland/Frostburg area.  WQZK-FM is owned and operated by West Virginia Radio Corporation.

Booster Station
In addition to the main station, WQZK-FM is relayed by an FM booster station to cover the downtown areas of Cumberland and Frostburg, along with the immediate surrounding areas.

References

External links
 94-1 QZK Online
 

1973 establishments in West Virginia
Contemporary hit radio stations in the United States
Radio stations established in 1973
QZK
QZK